Ondaatje may refer to:

 Christopher Ondaatje (born 1933),  Sri Lankan born Canadian-English businessman, philanthropist, adventurer, and writer
 Kim Ondaatje (born 1928), Canadian painter, photographer, and filmmaker
 Michael Ondaatje (born 1943) Sri Lankan-born Canadian novelist and poet
 Pearl Ondaatje, Sri Lankan radio personality
 Quint Ondaatje (1758–1818), Dutch patriot and politician

See also

 6569 Ondaatje
 Ondaatje Prize